The closed circle of suspects  is a common element of detective fiction, and the subgenre that employs it can be referred to as the closed circle mystery.  Less precisely, this subgenre – works with the closed circle literary device – is simply known as the "classic", "traditional" or "cozy" detective fiction.

It refers to a situation in which for a given crime (usually a murder), there is a quickly established, limited number of suspects, each with credible means, motive, and opportunity. In other words, it is known that the criminal is one of the people present at or nearby the scene, and the crime could not have been committed by some outsider. The detective has to solve the crime, figuring out the criminal from this pool of suspects, rather than searching for an entirely unknown perpetrator.

History
This type of narrative originated with the British detective fiction. Agatha Christie's The Mysterious Affair at Styles (1920) has been credited as a work that started this trend. Other writers of that period, dating to the first half of the 20th century, a time known as the Golden Age of Detective Fiction (or more general, mystery fiction), reliant on the closed circle and related literary devices include Dorothy L. Sayers, G. K. Chesterton, Margery Allingham, Ngaio Marsh and Americans S. S. Van Dine and Ellery Queen.

Those early closed circle mysteries preferred a common setting: a British country house. The country house was such a common element that it gave another name to what is essentially the same genre and the literary device, the "country house mystery". The persons involved were also commonly part of the upper class, generally the landed gentry. Other settings than the country house are also possible, and many have been used in the closed circle mysteries even by Christie herself: a ship, a train, an island, and so on. Nonetheless, the requirements for this mystery enforce certain limitations on this genre, and make certain settings, particularly those that explain limited access outsiders would have, and characters with an upper class background – much more common than the others. The numbers of suspects vary, from a group as small as four or five, to all the passengers of a train, coach or wagon.

After Second World War the closed circle mystery became less common, as other types of crime novels rose to prominence. Nonetheless other writers have continued to use this device till modern days, for example Rex Stout, Lucille Kallen, Cyril Hare, Jonathan Gash, Simon Brett.

While the closed circle is a common device in literary fiction, it is a much less common occurrence in real world investigations.

Country house mystery  
Examples of the "Country house mystery" from the Golden Age are: 
And Then There Were None by Agatha Christie (on an island)
Death and the Dancing Footman by Ngaio Marsh (isolated by a snowstorm)

Other "Closed Circle... mysteries"  
Murder on the Orient Express by  Agatha Christie (a stalled train in a snowdrift)
Death on the Nile by Agatha Christie (on a Nile river steamer)

See also
Cluedo, a board game with a closed circle of suspects as its premise
Danganronpa, a visual novel video game franchise that takes the form of a collection of closed-circle murder-mysteries
Locked-room mystery

References

Detective fiction
Narrative techniques
Puzzles